Live Johnny Winter And is an album by Johnny Winter, recorded with his group Johnny Winter And live during the fall of 1970 at the Fillmore East in New York City and at Pirate's World in Dania, Florida.  It was released in March 1971.

Besides Winter, the group included guitarist Rick Derringer and bassist Randy Jo Hobbs, both former members of the McCoys, and drummer Bobby Caldwell. (Caldwell had replaced ex-McCoy Randy Zehringer after the group recorded their self-titled studio album a few months earlier).

The album was one of Winter's most successful on the album charts in the U.S., U.K., and Canada. A single from the album, "Jumpin' Jack Flash" backed with "Good Morning Little School Girl", was his highest showing on the U.S. Hot 100 chart. In 2010, additional songs recorded during the same tour were released on Live at the Fillmore East 10/3/70.

Critical reception

In a review for AllMusic, Bruce Eder noted that, although the album was recorded during the tour to promote the group's recent studio album, it "is weighted very heavily toward Winter's covers of well-known rock & roll numbers... But for all of the musical virtues (and obvious joy) that Winter and company bring to those standards, the most interesting cuts here are 'It's My Own Fault' and Winter's own 'Mean Town Blues'."

Robert Christgau found fault with "Mean Town Blues", however, he felt "this is what every live album ought to be and all too few are: loud, fast, raucous, and to the point".

Track listing

Personnel
Johnny Winter And
Johnny Wintervocals, guitar
Rick Derringervocals, guitar
Randy Jo Hobbsvocals, bass
Bobby Caldwelldrums, percussion
Production
Produced by Johnny Winter and Rick Derringer
On-site production: Murray Krugman
Engineering: Jim Reeves, Jim Greene, Tim Geelan, Ronnie Albert, Howie Albert, Russ Payne
Photography: Norman Seeff
Design: Dick Mantel, Norman Seeff

Charts and certification
Live Johnny Winter And is the only Winter album to be certified by the RIAA as "Gold" (selling in excess of 500,000 copies) in the U.S. In the UK, it peaked at number 20, which was his best showing on the UK Albums Chart. It was also Winter's highest performing live album on the U.S. Billboard 200 and Canadian RPM100 album charts. A single from the album, "Jumpin' Jack Flash" backed with "Good Morning Little School Girl", reached number 89 on Billboard's Hot 100 chart and became his highest entry on the main U.S. singles chart.

References

Johnny Winter albums
Albums produced by Rick Derringer
1971 live albums
Columbia Records live albums
Albums produced by Johnny Winter
Live rock albums